Cape October (Mys Oktyabr’skiy) is a headland in Severnaya Zemlya, Russia.

History
This cape was named during the 1930–1932 expedition to the archipelago led by Georgy Ushakov and Nikolay Urvantsev after the month of the 1917 Russian Revolution.

Thelodonti fossils from the Upper Silurian have been found in the area of the headland, as well as extinct marine mollusks of the Hiatellidae family.

Geography
Cape October is located in a low-lying unglaciated area of the northern part of October Revolution Island north of the Albanov Glacier. It faces the Red Army Strait opposite the Academy of Sciences Glacier on Komsomolets Island shore.

See also
List of research stations in the Arctic

References

External links
Russian scientists have found a sharp decrease in the concentration of ozone over the Cape October Research Base (in Russian)
Thélodontes du Silurien supérieur de l’Archipel de Severnaya Zemlya (Russie)
МОРСКИЕ МОЛЛЮСКИ АТЛАНТИЧЕСКОГО ПРОИСХОЖДЕНИЯ ИЗ ОТЛОЖЕНИЙ ПЛИОЦЕНА – ЭОПЛЕЙСТОЦЕНА ЗАПАДА РОССИЙСКОЙ АРКТИКИ И ИХ БИОСТРАТИГРАФИЧЕСКОЕ ЗНАЧЕНИЕ - Моллюски рода Isocrassina

October
October
October